Illighausen is a village and former municipality in the canton of Thurgau, Switzerland.

History

It was first recorded in the year 1176 as Illinchusen.

Population
The municipality had 284 inhabitants in 1850, which increased to 295 in 1900 but then decreased to 275 in 1950 and 241 in 1990.

Geography
In 1998 the municipality was merged with the neighboring municipality Oberhofen bei Kreuzlingen, to form a new and larger municipality called Lengwil.

References

Former municipalities of Thurgau
Villages in Switzerland
Populated places in Switzerland